Kiumeni (Eng: Masculinity), is a 2017 Tanzanian comedy film directed by Nicholas Marwa and co-produced by Daniel Manege and Ernest Napoleon for D-Magic and Busy Bees respectively. The film stars Antu Mendoza and Ernest Napoleon in lead roles along with Irene Paul, Idris Sultan and Akbar Thabeet in supportive roles. The film rotates The film is a Swahili love story between two distinct worlds together; an affluent guy meet his girlfriend in the ghetto.

The film received critical acclaim and officially selected to screen at several international film festivals. The film won the Best Screenplay and Best Directing awards at the 2017 Zanzibar International Film Festival. The film has been set in Dar es Salaam and shot in and around the cities: Mikocheni, Kinondoni, Sinza, Mbezi, Mwananyamala and Mburahati.

Cast
 Antu Mendoza as Faith
 Ernest Napoleon as Gue
 Irene Paul as Irene
 Idris Sultan as Gasper
 Akbar Thabeet as Masto

References

External links
 
 Official trailer of Kiumeni  in YouTube

2017 films
Tanzanian comedy films
2017 comedy films